Balâtre is a commune in the Somme department in Hauts-de-France in northern France.

Geography
A small farming village, situated 6.4 kilometres (6 miles) to the east of Roye, on the D248 road.

Population

See also
Communes of the Somme department

References

Communes of Somme (department)